Kileler (between 1919 and 1985: Κυψέλη - Kypseli) is a village and a municipality in the regional unit of Larissa in Greece. The seat of the municipality is in Nikaia. The village became known for the Kileler incident that occurred on March 6, 1910.

Transport
The village is served by Kypseli railway station, on the Larissa-Volos branch line

Municipality
The municipality Kileler was formed at the 2011 local government reform by the merger of the following 5 former municipalities, that became municipal units:
Armenio
Kileler
Krannonas
Nikaia
Platykampos

The municipality Kileler has an area of 976.26 km2, the municipal unit Kileler has an area of 147.350 km2, and the community Kileler has an area of 34.478 km2.

References
Further reading:
 Population Exchange in Macedonia: The Rural Settlement of Refugees, 1922 - 1930 by Elisabeth Kontogiorgi (Oxford: Clarendon Press, 2006)
 Inside Hitler's Greece: The Experience of Occupation, 1941-44, by Mark Mazower (Yale Nota Bene, 2001).

Municipalities of Thessaly
Populated places in Larissa (regional unit)